Kempiella is a genus of birds in the Australasian robin family Petroicidae that are found in Australia and New Guinea.

The genus was introduced by the Australian ornithologist Gregory Mathews in 1913 with the yellow-legged flyrobin (Kempiella griseoceps) as the type species. The two species in this genus were formerly placed in genus Microeca. They were moved to the resurrected genus Kempiella based on the results of a molecular phylogenetic study published in 2011.

Species
The genus contains the following two species:

 Yellow-legged flyrobin (Kempiella griseoceps)
 Olive flyrobin (Kempiella flavovirescens)

References

 
Bird genera